Perigee: Publication for the Arts is a quarterly literary journal, founded in 2003, that publishes poetry, prose, and artwork.  It is based in San Diego, California, and St. Louis, Missouri.  The founding editor is Robert Judge Woerheide.

In 2009 Web Del Sol named Perigee as one of the top 50 literary publications in the world.

Notable past contributors include Tom Sheehan, Gladys Swan and Norman Mailer.

Submissions
Submissions are allowed directly through Perigee's web site.  Approximately 95% of Perigee's submissions come from authors without a literary agent. About 40% of the work published is from first-time authors, making it a popular venue for new voices in literature. Perigee receives about 1,500 submissions each year. Approximately 70% of these submissions are poetry.

Contests
Perigee holds annual contests in fiction and poetry.

The poetry contest is held each year beginning September 1 and ending December 31. Past judges have included Judy Jordan, Steve Kowit, Marvin Bell and Joseph Millar.  The fiction contest runs from January 1 to May 31. Past judges have included Thomas E. Kennedy and James Brown.

2009 Fiction Contest Winners
First Place - Jacob M. Appel
Second Place - Rachel Allyson Stone
Third Place - Sarah Lynn Knowles

Staff
The all volunteer staff consists of writers and educators from the Southern California area.  At various times the staff has included California State University San Marcos Professors Susan Fellows; poet Jensea Storie; Kathryn Woerheide; photographer Fred T. Buckley; writer and educator Benjamin Arnold; poet Leighann Timbs; John McGuinness; and novelist Duff Brenna.  As of 2006, Board of Directors consisted of Robert Judge Woerheide (President, Treasurer), Susan Fellows (Vice President), and Kathryn Margery Woerheide (Secretary).

In 2008, poetry editor Jensea Storie retired from the editorial board, as did founding editor Susan Fellows.

In 2009, noted writers Walter Cummins and Thomas E. Kennedy joined Perigee as contributing editors, and R.A. Rycraft began serving as non-fiction editor. Award-winning poet Steve Kowit joined Perigee as poetry editor in April 2009.

See also
 List of literary magazines
 e-zine

References

External links
 Perigee: Publication for the Arts

American literature websites
Magazines established in 2003
Magazines published in California
Magazines published in St. Louis
Mass media in San Diego
Online literary magazines published in the United States
Poetry magazines published in the United States
Quarterly magazines published in the United States